Larrey may refer to:

 Larrey, Côte-d'Or, a commune of the Côte-d'Or département, France
 Dominique Jean Larrey (1766-1842), senior French surgeon in Napoleon's army
 Isaac de Larrey (1638/39 – 1719), French historian

See also 
 Larry (disambiguation)